Don Mills was a provincial electoral district in Ontario, Canada.  It was created for the 1963 provincial election, and lasted until the provincial redistribution in 1996.  The riding was formally retired with the 1999 provincial election. At its abolition, the riding consisted of the neighbourhoods of Woodbine Gardens and Parkview Hill in the borough of East York plus the neighbourhoods of Flemingdon Park and the southern part of Don Mills in North York (all of North York south of Lawrence Avenue). It was abolished into Don Valley East, Don Valley West and Beaches—East York.

The riding was a bastion of strength for the Progressive Conservative Party of Ontario for most of its history, and was represented by moderate Tory cabinet ministers Dennis Timbrell and David Johnson at different times.  The Liberal Party and the New Democratic Party both represented the riding between 1987 and 1993.

Boundaries
The riding was created in 1963, one of several new ridings in Metro. The initial boundaries were the North York city limits on the south and east and west and Lawrence Avenue East formed the northern boundary.

Members of Provincial Parliament

Electoral results

References

Notes

Citations

Former provincial electoral districts of Ontario
Provincial electoral districts of Toronto